The 29th César Awards ceremony, presented by the Académie des Arts et Techniques du Cinéma, honoured the best films of 2003 in France and took place on 21 February 2004 at the Théâtre du Châtelet in Paris. The ceremony was chaired by Fanny Ardant and hosted by Gad Elmaleh. The Barbarian Invasions won the award for Best Film.

Winners and nominees

See also
 76th Academy Awards
 57th British Academy Film Awards
 16th European Film Awards
 9th Lumières Awards

External links

 Official website
 
 29th César Awards at AlloCiné

2004
2004 film awards
2004 in French cinema
2004 in Paris
February 2004 events in France